Dali is Ali Project's third studio album, released on February 16, 1994.

Track listing

References

Ali Project albums